Enielkenie is a genus of East Asian araneomorph spiders in the family Anapidae, containing the single species, Enielkenie acaroides. It was  first described by H. Ono, Y. H. Chang & I. M. Tso in 2007, and has only been found in Taiwan.

References

Anapidae
Monotypic Araneomorphae genera
Spiders of Taiwan